GWL may refer to:

 Gardeners' World Live
 Glasgow Women's Library
 Great Wall Airlines
 Great West League
 Great Wolf Lodge
 Gwalior Airport, in India
 Gwalior Junction railway station
 Grow With Loans 
 GwL, class of goods van with the Royal Bavarian State Railways